Yznaga is a census-designated place (CDP) in Cameron County, Texas, United States. The population was 91 at the 2010 census. It is part of the Brownsville–Harlingen Metropolitan Statistical Area.

Geography
Yznaga is located near the northwest corner of Cameron County at  (26.312616, -97.817895). It is bordered to the north by Sebastian in Willacy County.

Demographics
As of the census of 2000, there were 103 people, 34 households, and 28 families residing in the CDP. The population density was 19.0 people per square mile (7.3/km2). There were 42 housing units at an average density of 7.7/sq mi (3.0/km2). The racial makeup of the CDP was 71.84% White, 28.16% from other races. Hispanic or Latino of any race were 85.44% of the population.

There were 34 households, out of which 38.2% had children under the age of 18 living with them, 61.8% were married couples living together, 17.6% had a female householder with no husband present, and 17.6% were non-families. 14.7% of all households were made up of individuals, and 8.8% had someone living alone who was 65 years of age or older. The average household size was 3.03 and the average family size was 3.39.

In the CDP, the population was spread out, with 31.1% under the age of 18, 6.8% from 18 to 24, 29.1% from 25 to 44, 16.5% from 45 to 64, and 16.5% who were 65 years of age or older. The median age was 34 years. For every 100 females, there were 90.7 males. For every 100 females age 18 and over, there were 73.2 males.

The median income for a household in the CDP was $15,938, and the median income for a family was $23,250. Males had a median income of $28,333 versus $0 for females. The per capita income for the CDP was $9,695. There were 31.6% of families and 21.1% of the population living below the poverty line, including none under 18 and 50.0% of those over 64.

Education
The Lyford Consolidated Independent School District serves Yznaga.

In addition, South Texas Independent School District operates magnet schools that serve the community.

References

Census-designated places in Cameron County, Texas
Census-designated places in Texas